Louise Arbour Secondary School is a high school located in Brampton, Ontario, operating under the Peel District School Board. It was established in 2010 to accommodate those who live in north Brampton between Sandalwood Heights Secondary School and Mayfield Secondary School.  A social justice focus infuses all elements of the curriculum in order to support students to become socially responsible citizens of the world.  The school offers a wide range of programs in all curricular areas along with Specialist High Skills Major programs in Arts and Culture as well as Hospitality and Tourism.  Science, mathematics and technology are particular focus areas in the school.

History
The school is named for Louise Arbour, former Justice of the Supreme Court of Canada and UN High Commissioner for Human Rights, and since 2017 the United Nations Secretary-General's Special Representative for International Migration.

Highlights

Louise Arbour Secondary School was one of the host schools for the Ontario Federation of School Athletic Associations (OFSAA) AAAA Boys' Volleyball and live streamed coverage of the event. Louise Arbour had won the Junior Boys Basketball tournament of Tier 2 Brampton schools in 2014.

Louise Arbour students provide video coverage of ROPSSAA wrestling.

Student Activity Council

The Student Activity Council at Louise Arbour Secondary Schools runs a variety of events and activities, throughout the school year.

List of Major Events and Activities at the School
 Halloween Bash in Cafeteria
 Bake Sales for Charity
 Christmas Bash in the Cafeteria
 Candy Grams
 Valentine's Day
 Semi Formal
 Talent Show
 Carnival
 BBQ

The Council is well known for the variety of events that are hosted each year. The biggest event at the school tends to be 'Semi Formal' - a night for students to get out and formally dress up for a dinner and dance night at a banquet hall, arranged and planned by members of the council. Approximately 200 students attend each year.

Yearbook
Students create a professional quality yearbook which is distributed to students each June.

Clubs and extracurriculars
Students are encouraged to get involved in the many clubs and teams available at Louise Arbour.  Along with sports teams, the Louise Arbour community offers opportunities for students to join a variety of clubs including Art Club, VEX Robotics, Computer Science Club, Cross-Country Running, DECA, STEM Olympics, Science Olympics, FIRST Robotics Competition, Band, Choir, Eco-Squad, Drama Club, AV Videography Club, DJ club.

See also
List of high schools in Ontario

References

Peel District School Board
High schools in Brampton
Educational institutions established in 2010
2010 establishments in Ontario